Euchaetes egle, the milkweed tiger moth or milkweed tussock moth, is a moth in the family Erebidae and the tribe Arctiini, the tiger moths. The species was first described by Dru Drury in 1773. It is a common mid- through late summer feeder on milkweeds and dogbane. Like most species in this family, it has chemical defenses it acquires from its host plants, in this case, cardiac glycosides. These are retained in adults and deter bats, and presumably other predators, from feeding on them. Only very high cardiac glycoside concentrations deterred bats, however. Adults indicate their unpalatability to bats with ultrasonic clicks from their tymbal organs.

Range
It is found from southern Canada and south through Texas and Florida in North America.

Lifecycle
One generation per year occurs in the north, and two or more may occur in the south.

Egg
Females lay eggs in masses on the undersides of leaves.

Larva
Early instars appear slightly hairy and gray. They skeletonize whole leaves gregariously, leaving lacy leaf remnants. They are gregarious until their third instar. Later instars sport tufts of black, white and orange (sometimes yellow) setae (hairs). The head capsule is black. The later instars wander much more, and may appear alone or in groups of up to 10. Mature caterpillars occur from June onwards. Larvae grow as long as 35 mm.

Pupa
The gray cocoon is felted, with hairs from the larvae, and overwinters (Wagner, 2005).

Adults
Wings are grayish. Abdomens are hairy and yellow, each with a row of black dots on its dorsum. Males use their tymbal organs in calling females and in defense against bats.

Food plants
This moth frequently uses milkweeds (Asclepias spp.) and sometimes dogbane (Apocynum spp.) as larval host plants. Larvae often feed on older milkweed shoots, and seldom share shoots with monarchs (Danaus plexippus), which prefer younger ones.

Dogbanes and milkweeds produce a sticky latex that can impede larval feeding. Early instars avoid the veins by skeletonizing the leaves. Older larvae sever the veins that supply the latex, which reduces latex flow to the area on which they feed.

References

External links
 Range map
Moths of Maryland. Images of adult

Moths described in 1773
Phaegopterina
Moths of North America
Taxa named by Carl Linnaeus